Rechmaya, is a village in the Aley District of Lebanon. Bechara El Khoury, Lebanon's first president after independence, was born in Rechmaya on August 10, 1890. The town is located in a mountainous area.

Etymology 
The name Rechmaya is from Aramaic "Resh Mayya" which means "waterhead."

References

External links
Richmaiya, Localiban

Populated places in Aley District
Maronite Christian communities in Lebanon